Jo Nesbø (born Jon Nesbø; 29 March 1960) is a Norwegian writer, musician, economist, and former football player and reporter. More than 3 million copies of his novels had been sold in Norway as of March 2014; his work has been translated into over 50 languages, and by 2021 had sold some 50 million copies worldwide, making him the most successful Norwegian author of all time.

Known primarily for his crime novels featuring Inspector Harry Hole, Nesbø is also the main vocalist and songwriter for the Norwegian rock band Di Derre. In 2007 he released his first children's book, Doktor Proktors Prompepulver (English translation: Doctor Proctor's Fart Powder). The 2011 film Headhunters is based on Nesbø's novel Hodejegerne (The Headhunters).

Early life
Nesbø was born in 1960 in Oslo and grew up in Molde. He graduated from the Norwegian School of Economics with a degree in Economics and Business Administration. He worked as a freelance journalist and a stockbroker before he began his writing career.

Career

The Harry Hole series
The series follows Harry Hole, a tough detective working for Crime Squad and later with the National Criminal Investigation Service (Kripos), whose investigations may take him from Oslo to Australia, Thailand, West Congo, Switzerland or Brazil. Hole takes on seemingly unconnected cases, sometimes found to involve serial killers, bank robbers, gangsters or the establishment, but spends a significant amount of time battling alcoholism and his own demons.

The Harry Hole novels are multi-layered, violent and often feature women in peril, as typified by The Snowman. On the return of Harry Hole in The Thirst, Nesbø said: "I was always coming back to Harry; he is my soul mate. But it is a dark soul, so it is – as always – both a thrill and a chilling, emotionally exhausting experience. But Harry and the story make it worth the sleepless nights."

A film adaptation of The Snowman, with Tomas Alfredson directing (replacing Martin Scorsese, who executive produced), and starring Michael Fassbender, Rebecca Ferguson, and Charlotte Gainsbourg, premiered in October 2017.

The Doctor Proctor series
Doctor Proctor's Fart Powder, originally published in 2007, was Nesbø's first children's book. They are illustrated by Mike Lowery. The series is set in Oslo, Norway and follows the story of Doctor Proctor, a crazy professor waiting for his big break, his next-door neighbor Lisa and her peculiar friend Nilly, a short redheaded boy. The ruthless twins Truls and Trym Thrane sometimes lurk in the background. Doctor Proctor's first major inventions are a powder that makes the user fart (and the farts don't smell) and the "Fartonaut Powder," which makes the user fart so powerfully that they blast into space. In book 2 he invents a bathtub that allows the user to travel through time. As of 2018, there are 5 books in the series.

In 2014 a live action film adaptation of the first book was made, and is only available in Norwegian. A sequel, Doktor Proktors Tidsbadekar, was released in 2015 with German involvement. Both films received mixed reviews.

The Olav Johansen series
It was announced in October 2013 that, writing under the pen-name of Tom Johansen, Nesbø had written at least two novels provisionally entitled Blood on Snow and More Blood on the Water, scheduled to be published in autumn 2014 and spring 2015. The books Blood on Snow and its sequel Midnight Sun: Blood on Snow 2 were published in 2015, but under Jo Nesbø's name.

It was also announced in October 2013 that Warner Brothers had bought the rights to Blood on Snow and planned to make a screen adaptation, to be produced by and possibly starring Leonardo DiCaprio. However, on 4 April 2017, it was reported that the screen rights had been purchased by Tobey Maguire's Material Pictures and Lawrence Grey's Grey Matter Productions, and that Maguire would make his directorial debut on the projected film adaptation.

This series follows Olav Johansen, a fixer for Oslo crime boss Daniel Hoffman. In Blood on Snow, Olav has just found the woman of his dreams. The only problem is that she's his boss's wife and that his boss has hired him to kill her.

A film adaptation of Midnight Sun, titled The Hanging Sun, directed by Francesco Carrozzini directing and starring Alessandro Borghi, Jessica Brown Findlay, Sam Spruell, Peter Mullan and Charles Dance, premiered at the 79th Venice International Film Festival in September 2022.

Other projects
In 2011, the Nesbø story Twelve was adapted by Magnus Martens into the film Jackpot, a black comedy crime mystery film.

In 2014 it was announced that Nesbø would contribute a re-telling of the story of Macbeth as part of the Hogarth Shakespeare project, described as a 'crime noir' version of the tragedy. His Macbeth is set in 1970 in an unspecified location that combines aspects of Scandinavia and Scotland, and involves an Inspector Macbeth of a paramilitary SWAT team targeting bikers, drug dealers, and his police colleagues. It was published in April 2018.

In 2016, it was announced that there are also plans to adapt his stand-alone novel, Sønnen (The Son), as a film, to be directed by Denis Villeneuve, with Jake Gyllenhaal as producer and Channing Tatum in the lead role.

On 5 April 2017, it was announced that Icelandic director Baltasar Kormakur was working on a new adaptation of I Am Victor, a short story by Nesbø previously planned as an NBC television series but not completed.

Personal life
Nesbø played top-flight football for Molde FK until he tore the cruciate ligaments in his knee, and had to concentrate on other aspects of his life. Nesbø is a dedicated rock climber, starting to climb seriously at age 50. In 2023 he realised an ambition to climb a French grade 8a sport route.

In addition to his career as an author, Nesbø was also the main vocalist and songwriter for the Norwegian rock band Di Derre. He lives close to his former wife and their daughter in Oslo.

Bibliography

The Harry Hole novels

 Flaggermusmannen (1997) (English: The Bat, 2012)
 Kakerlakkene (1998) (English: Cockroaches, 2013)
 Rødstrupe (2000) (English: The Redbreast, 2006)
 Sorgenfri (2002) (English: Nemesis, 2008)
 Marekors (2003) (English: The Devil's Star, 2005)
 Frelseren (2005) (English: The Redeemer, 2009)
 Snømannen (2007) (English: The Snowman, 2010)  – Adapted into the 2017 film of the same name.
 Panserhjerte (2009) (English: The Leopard, 2011)
 Gjenferd (2011) (English: Phantom, 2012)
 Politi (2013) (English: Police, 2013)
 Tørst (2017) (English: The Thirst, 2017)
 Kniv (2019) (English: Knife, 2019)
 Blodmåne (2022) (English: Killing Moon, 2023)

The Doctor Proctor novels

 Doktor Proktors Prompepulver (2007) (English: Doctor Proctor's Fart Powder) (2010)
 Doktor Proktors Tidsbadekaret (2008) (English: Doctor Proctor's Fart Powder: Bubble in the Bathtub) (2011)
 Doktor Proktor Og Verdens Undergang. Kanskje. (2010) (English: Doctor Proctor's Fart Powder: The End of The World. Maybe.; also known as Doctor Proctor's Fart Powder: Who Cut the Cheese?) (2012)
 Doktor Proktor Og Det Store Gullrøveriet (2012) (English: Doctor Proctor's Fart Powder: The Great Gold Robbery; also known as Doctor Proctor's Fart Powder: The Magical Fruit) (2014)
 Kan Doktor Proktor Redde Jula? (2017) (English: Doctor Proctor's Fart Powder: Can Doctor Proctor Save Christmas? also known as Doctor Proctor's Fart Powder: Silent (but Deadly) Night) (2018)

The Olav Johansen novels
 Blod På Snø (2015) (English: Blood on Snow, 2015)
 Mere Blod (2015) (English: Midnight Sun, 2015)

Stand-alone works
 Karusellmusikk (2001) – Short stories
 Det Hvite Hotellet (2007) (English: The White Hotel)
 Hodejegerne (2008) (English: Headhunters) – Adapted into the 2011 film of the same name.
 Sønnen (2014) (English: The Son, 2014)
 Macbeth (April 2018)
 Kongeriket (2020) (English: The Kingdom, 2020)
 Sjalusimannen Og Andre Fortellinger (2021) (English: The Jealousy Man and Other Stories, 2021)
Rotteøya Og Andre Fortellinger (2021)

Non-fiction
  with Espen Søbye, Stemmer fra Balkan/Atten dager i mai (1999) (English: Figures in the Balkans)

TV series
Okkupert (Occupied), based on a concept by Jo Nesbø, is a television series produced by TV 2 and Yellow Bird, the Swedish production house responsible for the Wallander TV series, and the films Headhunters and The Girl with the Dragon Tattoo. The series is a political thriller which envisages what would happen if Norway were to be invaded by Russia to seize the nation's oil resources. The first season premiered in October 2015, the second in September 2017, and the third in January 2020.

Awards and nominations
 The Riverton Prize 1997 for Best Norwegian Crime Novel of the Year (The Bat)
 The Glass Key Award 1998 for Best Nordic Crime Novel of the Year (The Bat)
 The Norwegian Booksellers' Prize for Best Novel of the Year 2000 (The Redbreast)
 The Mads Wiel Nygaard Bursary 2002 (Nemesis)
 Best Norwegian Crime Novel Ever Written awarded by the Norwegian book clubs in 2004 (The Redbreast)
 The Finnish Academy of Crime Writers' Special Commendation 2007 for Excellence in Foreign Crime Writing (The Devil's Star)
 Shortlisted for Duncan Lawrie International Dagger 2007 (The Redbreast)
 The Norwegian Booksellers' Prize for Best Novel of the Year 2007 (The Snowman)
 Shortlisted for Ark's Children's Book Award for Best Children's Book 2007 (Doctor Proctor's Fart Powder)
 The Norwegian Book Club Prize 2008 for Best Novel of the Year (The Snowman)
 Nominated for the Norwegian Bookseller's Prize 2008 (Headhunters and Doctor Proctor's Time Bathtub)
 Nominated for the Edgar Award 2010 (Nemesis)
 Awarded the Norwegian Peer Gynt Prize 2013

References

External links
 
 Full biography and bibliography about Jo Nesbø on Knigosearch.com
 

 
1960 births
Living people
Norwegian pop musicians
Norwegian crime fiction writers
Norwegian children's writers
20th-century Norwegian novelists
21st-century Norwegian novelists
Norwegian footballers
Molde FK players
People from Molde
Musicians from Oslo
Stockbrokers
Writers from Oslo
Association football forwards
Nordic Noir writers
Norwegian School of Economics alumni